Vehran (also Romanized as Vehrān) is a village in Mah Neshan Rural District, in the Central District of Mahneshan County, Zanjan Province, Iran. At the 2006 census, its population was 630, in 152 families.

References 

Populated places in Mahneshan County